Shadows of the Workhouse is a 2005 book by British author Jennifer Worth (1935-2011). It formed the basis for the second series of the television drama Call the Midwife.

Setting 
Although Britain's workhouses were officially abolished in 1930, many did not close their doors until much later. Renamed Public Assistance Institutions, they continued under the control of county councils. At the outbreak of the Second World War in 1939 almost 100,000 people were accommodated in former workhouses, including 5000 children. It was not until the 1948 National Assistance Act that the last traces of the Poor Law disappeared, and with them the workhouses.

Subsequently, until the end of the 20th century and early years of the 21st, there were still many people who had lasting memories of life in the workhouses. Some as young adult, others who had been born there or sent as orphans.  Worth based her book on the lives of such people, many of whom she met through her work as a midwife in London's East End during the 1950s and 1960s.

Characters 
 Jane
 Sir Ian Astor-Smaleigh
 Frank
 Peggy
 Sister Monica Joan
 Aunt Anne
 Joseph Collett
 Chummy Browne (Camilla Fortescue-Cholmeley-Browne), a very tall, upper-class young nurse
 Cynthia Miller, a kind and thoughtful young nurse
 Trixie Franklin, a fun-loving young nurse
 Sister Julienne
 Sister Evangelina
 Novice Ruth
 Sir Lorimer Elliott-Bartram

Reception

References 

2005 non-fiction books
British memoirs
Poor law infirmaries
History of London
Works about midwifery
Call the Midwife (franchise)